Jart or JART may refer to:

 A brand of lawn dart
 Jart Armin, a computer security specialist
 Joint Aircraft Recovery and Transportation Squadron (JARTS), a British military post-crash management and aircraft transport unit
 Jarts, an alien race in The Way (novel series) by Greg Bear

See also
Jarte, a word processor
Jaat (disambiguation)